Sofi was the Mascot official of 2010 ISF Women's World Championship in Caracas, Venezuela. This is a cat that suggests tenderness, and a lot of strength, conveys the beauty and intelligence of the Venezuelan woman. It is called Sofi, an acronym for SOFtball International. Designed by Fractal Studio, a design studio in Venezuela. Was filed on May 20, 2010.

Personality 
She is a bold cat, spontaneous and clever. she loves acting on stage and always follow your intuition, but sometimes becomes very exaggerated. It is usually very sociable, as well as being loving and kind. I like softball.

See also 
 Mascot

References

External links 
 Sofi ya es parte del Mundial de Softbol.
 2010 World Championship opened and underway!.

ISF Women's World Championship
Women's Softball World Championship